Diatomovora is a genus of worms belonging to the family Isodiametridae.

The species of this genus are found in Central America.

Species:

Diatomovora amoena 
Diatomovora jacki

References

Acoelomorphs